Blue Winter is a Canadian docufiction film, directed by André Blanchard and released in 1979. Using a cast of non-professional actors, the film centres on Christiane (Christiane Lévesque) and Nicole (Nicole Scant), two young adult sisters trying to establish themselves in the economically struggling city of Rouyn-Noranda, Quebec.

The film won the Prix de la critique québécoise in 1979.

It was later screened at the 1984 Festival of Festivals as part of Front & Centre, a special retrospective program of artistically and culturally significant films from throughout the history of Canadian cinema.

References

External links

1979 films
Canadian docufiction films
Films shot in Quebec
Films set in Abitibi-Témiscamingue
French-language Canadian films
1970s Canadian films